Bert Henry Miller (December 15, 1876 – October 8, 1949) was an American politician from Idaho and a member of the Democratic Party.

Biography
Born in St. George, Utah Territory, Miller graduated from Brigham Young University in 1901 and from Cumberland School of Law at Cumberland University in Lebanon, Tennessee in 1902. He was admitted to the bar and commenced practice in St. Anthony, Idaho in 1903, and was prosecuting attorney of Fremont County from 1912 to 1914.

Miller ran unsuccessfully for the U.S. House of Representatives in 1914. He was elected Idaho Attorney General in 1932, and reelected in 1934. He was an unsuccessful candidate for the Democratic gubernatorial nomination in 1936, and served for two months in 1938 as Idaho's labor commissioner. Miller was an unsuccessful Democratic candidate for election in 1938 to the Seventy-sixth Congress. He was an attorney in the Wage and Hour Division of the U.S. Department of Labor at Seattle, Washington in 1939 and 1940. He again became Attorney General of Idaho from 1940 to 1944, during which time he was an advocate for Japanese-American internment camps. Miller "expressed an even more extreme view, advocating that they be put into concentration camps for the remainder of the war and that no attempt be made to provide work for them. Their labor was not needed, he said, and after the war they should be sent back to California: 'We want to keep this a white man's country.' " 

He was elected a justice of the state's supreme court in 1944.

Miller was elected to the United States Senate in 1948, defeating Republican incumbent Henry Dworshak, but died of a heart attack after only nine months in office. Governor C. A. Robins appointed Dworshak to succeed him. As of 2021, Miller remains the last Democrat to hold the Class II U.S. Senate seat from Idaho.

Miller is buried in Morris Hill Cemetery in Boise.

Congressional elections

House

Senate

Source:

See also 
 List of United States Congress members who died in office (1900–49)

References

External links

1876 births
1949 deaths
Brigham Young University alumni
Idaho lawyers
American prosecutors
Justices of the Idaho Supreme Court
Idaho Attorneys General
Idaho Democrats
Democratic Party United States senators from Idaho
People from St. George, Utah
People from St. Anthony, Idaho